Udalrich or Uodalrich is a German personal name and is derived from the  Old High German word elements uodal ("allodium") and richi ("mighty", "ruler"). The modern form of the name is Ulrich.

Notable bearers of the name 
 Oldřich (d 1034), Duke of Bohemia
 Udalrichinger, a Frankish-Alemannic aristocratic family who lived from the 8th the 11th century
 Ulrich of Brünn (d 1113), Duke of Brünn and Znaim
 Udalrich I (d 1099), Bishop of Eichstätt from 1075
 Ulrich I of Passau (also: Udalrich; b around 1027, d 1121), monastery founder and Bishop of the Diocese of Passau
 Udalrich II of Eichstätt (d 1125), Bishop of Eichstätt from 1112 
 Udalrich I (count), Frankish-Alemannic count and primogenitor of the Udalrichingers
 Udalrich I of Scheyern
 Udalrich II Birker, abbot of Waldsassen Abbey from 1479 to 1486
 Udalrich II of Moravia (1134–1177), Duke of Brünn and Königsgrätz 
 Udalrich of Graz, Hochfreier, d after 1156
 Udalrich of Graz (Dunkelstein), burggrave, d after 1164
 Ulrich of Zell (around 1029–1093), monk and saint 
 Ulrich of Bamberg (also: Udalrich of Bamberg or Udalricus Babenbergensis; d probably 1127), Roman Catholic priest and chronicler in Bamberg
 Udalrich Schaufelbühl (1789–1856), Swiss politician